The Francesco Caracciolo-class battleships were a group of four super-dreadnought battleships designed for the  (Royal Italian Navy) in 1913 and ordered in 1914. The first ship of the class, Francesco Caracciolo, was laid down in late 1914; the other three ships, Cristoforo Colombo, Marcantonio Colonna, and Francesco Morosini followed in 1915.

The class was never completed due to material shortages and shifting construction priorities after the outbreak of World War I in 1914. Only the lead ship was launched in 1920, and several proposals to convert her into an aircraft carrier were considered, but budgetary problems prevented any work being done. She was sold to an Italian shipping firm for conversion into a merchant ship, but this also proved to be too expensive, and she was broken up for scrap beginning in 1926.

Design
With tensions high in Europe and a naval arms race underway, he secured authorization for a huge new construction program, which called for four new battleships, three cruisers, and numerous other warships. They were intended to match the new fast battleships being built in foreign navies, such as the British . Rear Admiral Edgardo Ferrati was responsible for preparing the designs. Ferrati originally called for a ship armed with twelve 381-millimeter guns and twenty  secondary guns, but by the time he had finalized the design, he had reduced the main battery to eight guns and the secondary battery to twelve guns.

Characteristics

They were to be equipped with two tripod masts.

The ships were to be powered by four Parsons steam turbines, each driving one shaft, using steam provided by twenty oil-fired Yarrow boilers. The boilers were trunked into two large funnels.

Francesco Caracciolo and her sisters were to be armed with a main battery of eight 40-caliber Cannone navale da 381/40 guns in four twin gun turrets, all mounted on the centerline in superfiring pairs fore and aft of the superstructure. The secondary armament of the ships would have consisted of a dozen 50-caliber Cannone navale da 152/50 (6 in) guns mounted in casemates clustered amidships. Anti-aircraft (AA) defense was to be provided by eight 45-caliber Cannone da 102/45 (4 in) guns and a dozen  guns.

Armor for the class consisted of Krupp cemented steel manufactured by Terni. The same level of protection was applied to the main battery turrets, while the secondary guns had  of armor protection.

Ships

Construction

Shortages of steel slowed the construction of the ships, and after Italy entered World War I in May 1915, other classes of warships, particularly destroyers, submarines, and other light craft were needed to combat the Central Powers. As a result, work on the ships was suspended in March 1916. Around  of steel had been built into the hull for Francesco Caracciolo when work stopped. Cristoforo Colombo was the next furthest along, 12.5 percent of the hull being completed and 5 percent of the machinery assembled. Work on the last two ships had not progressed significantly by the time work on them halted. Two of the heavy guns intended for Cristoforo Colombo were installed aboard the monitor . The monitor  received a pair of 381 mm guns from Francesco Morosini, and the two  and four s were also equipped with spare 381 mm guns. Four guns were converted into Cannone da 381/40 AVS railroad guns and others were emplaced as coast-defense guns.

Work resumed on Francesco Caracciolo in October 1919, but she was not to be completed. That year, the  considered converting the ship into a flush-decked aircraft carrier similar to the British . The poor economic situation in Italy in the aftermath of World War I and the heavy expenses of the Italian pacification campaigns in Libya forced severe reductions in the naval budget. As a result, a modern carrier conversion could not be completed. The Ansaldo shipyard proposed converting Francesco Caracciolo into a floatplane carrier, a cheaper alternative.

As well as the budgetary problems, the senior Italian navy commanders could not agree on the shape of the post-war . One faction advocated a traditional surface battle fleet, while a second believed a fleet composed of aircraft carriers, torpedo boats, and submarines would be ideal. A third faction, led by Admiral Giovanni Sechi, argued that a balanced fleet with a core of battleships and carriers was the most flexible option. To secure budgetary space for new construction, Sechi drastically reduced the number of older ships in service; he also cancelled the battleships of the Francesco Caracciolo class. Francesco Caracciolo was sold on 25 October 1920 to the  shipping company. The firm planned to convert her into a merchant ship, but the work was deemed too expensive, and so she was temporarily mothballed in Baia Bay outside Naples.

By this time, the  had returned to the idea of converting the ship into an aircraft carrier. A new conversion design, featuring an island superstructure, was prepared for Francesco Caracciolo but Italy's chronic budgetary problems prevented the navy building any of these ships. Francesco Caracciolo was subsequently broken up for scrap, starting in late 1926. The other three ships had been dismantled shortly after the war, with some of the machinery from Cristoforo Columbo used in the construction of the ocean liner .

Notes

References

External links
 Francesco Caracciolo Marina Militare website

Battleship classes
Abandoned military projects of Italy
Proposed ships